The Latin phrase sanctum sanctorum is a translation of the Hebrew term קֹדֶשׁ הַקֳּדָשִׁים (Qṓḏeš HaQŏḏāšîm), literally meaning Holy of Holies, which generally refers in Latin texts to the holiest place of the Ancient Israelites, inside the Tabernacle and later inside the Temple in Jerusalem, but the term also has some derivative use in application to imitations of the Tabernacle in church architecture.

The plural form sancta sanctorum is also used, arguably as a synecdoche, referring to the holy relics contained in the sanctuary. The Vulgate translation of the Bible uses sancta sanctorum for the Holy of Holies. Hence the derivative usage to denote the Sancta Sanctorum chapel in the complex of the Archbasilica of Saint John Lateran, Rome.

In Hinduism, a temple's innermost part where the Murti of the deity is kept forms the Garbha griha, also referred to as a sanctum sanctorum.

Etymology
The Latin word sanctum is the neuter form of the adjective "holy", and sanctorum its genitive plural. Thus the term sanctum sanctorum literally means "the holy [place/thing] of the holy [places/things]", replicating in Latin the Hebrew construction for the superlative, with the intended meaning "the most holy [place/thing]".

Use of the term in modern languages 
The Latin word sanctum may be used in English, following Latin, for "a holy place", or a sanctuary, as in the novel Jane Eyre (1848) which refers to "the sanctum of school room".

Romance languages tend to use the form sancta sanctorum, treating it as masculine and singular. E.g., the Spanish dictionary of the Real Academia Española admits sanctasanctórum (without the space and with an accent) as a derivative Spanish noun denoting both the Holy of Holies in the Temple in Jerusalem, any secluded and mysterious place, and something that a person holds in the highest esteem.

The term is still often used by Indian writers for the garbhagriha or inner shrine chamber in Hindu temple architecture, after being introduced by British writers in the 19th century.

German Catholic processions
Some regional branches of the Catholic Church, e. g. Germans, are wont to refer to the Blessed Sacrament, when adored in the tabernacle or in exposition or procession (e.g. on Corpus Christi), as the Holy of Holies. By custom, It is adored with genuflection; with a double genuflection, that is a short moment of kneeling on both knees, if in exposition; in the procession this ritual may be nonrigoristically alleviated, but at least a simple genuflection is appropriate when It is elevated by the priest for blessing or immediately after transsubstantiation. Personnel in uniform — which in Germany includes student corporations — give the military salute when passing by or in the moment of elevation.

The "enclosed house" of Hindu temple architecture
The garbhagriha in Hindu temple architecture (a shrine inside a temple complex where the main deity is installed in a separate building by itself inside the complex) has also been compared to a "sanctum sanctorum" in texts on Hindu temple architecture, though the Sanskrit term actually means "enclosed house" or "the deep interior of the house". However, some Indian English authors seem to have translated the Sanskrit term literally as "womb house".

References

Vulgate Latin words and phrases
Superlatives in religion
Sacral architecture